The 1999–00 Kazakhstan Cup is the eighth season of the Kazakhstan Cup, the annual nationwide football cup competition of Kazakhstan since the independence of the country. The competition begins on 11 May 1999, and will end with the final in Jule 2000. Kaisar-Hurricane are the defending champions, having won their first cup in the 1998-99 competition.

First round

Quarter-finals

Semi-finals

Final

References

Kazakhstan Cup seasons
1999–2000 domestic association football cups
1999 in Kazakhstani football
2000 in Kazakhstani football